Australinina is a genus of flies belonging to the family Lauxaniidae.

The species of this genus are found in Australia.

Species:
 Australinina geniseta (Malloch, 1925) 
 Australinina plax Kim, 1994 
 Australinina spatula Kim, 1994

References

Lauxaniidae